The Burkhan Bakshin Altan Sume ("The Golden Abode of the Buddha Sakyamuni") is a Gelug Buddhist monastery in Elista, the capital of the Republic of Kalmykia, a federal subject of the Russian Federation. The temple contains the largest Buddha statue in Europe (63 m).

It was opened on December 27, 2005 at the site of a former factory. More than 5,000 people attended the opening ceremony, including representatives of Tibetan Buddhist communities from Moscow, Volgograd and Saratov.

The 14th Dalai Lama blessed the site of the future temple just before he left Elista during his November 2004 visit to the Republic and gave it its name on March 11, 2006. 

During the opening ceremony, the Republic of Kalmykia President Kirsan Ilyumzhinov dedicated the temple to Kalmyks who died during and after their sudden and forced exile to Siberia. The date corresponded with Zul, the Kalmyk New Year, and the anniversary of the 1943 deportations (December 27, 1943).

References

External links 

 Burkhan Bakshin Altan Sume (The Golden Abode of the Buddha Shakyamuni).

Buddhist monasteries in Russia
Gelug monasteries
Buddhism in Kalmykia
2005 establishments in Russia
Buildings and structures in Elista
Religious buildings and structures completed in 2005